Shootin' Goon were a Welsh ska punk outfit of the late 1990s and early 2000s who were signed to the label Moon Ska Europe and later Good Clean Fun Records.  
  
Shootin' Goon released their debut album Splottside Rocksteady in 2000, with the title inspired by the Splott area of the band's hometown of Cardiff. The band later signed to lead singer Matt's own record label Good Clean Fun Records, and released the Left for Dead EP in 2003. The EP was reviewed by skateboarder Bam Margera for rock magazine Kerrang!, in which he declared "I thought I was at the fucking circus!" prompting the band to sell T-shirts with the quote printed on them.

The band broke up in 2004 following a self-organised tour. Following the band's demise Matt became manager of fellow Cardiff band Adequate Seven. The band reformed for a one off show in support of Adequate Seven on their last gig in Cardiff on 10 December 2006.

Lineup
Original lineup (1998):
St. John of Caerphilly - vocals (left just weeks after the completion of Splottside Rocksteady in 1999 and in 2000 the vocals were re-recorded by new singer James)
Paul Hewett - guitar
Jimi Hewett - bass
James 'Ferret' Watkins - trumpet
Dan - saxophone
Dan Jones - trombone
Tom Harle - trombone 
Sam Kendall - drums

Later band members: Some members were needed only once
Dan S (a.k.a. Yeti from the north) - Sax (joined in 1999?, left a few years later)
James Alexander - vocals (joined early 2000)
Matt "Cheap" Redd - vocals (joined 2002, previously of The Cheapskates)
Tom Harle - trombone (joined 1999, also appears on The Cheapskates EP and Adequate Seven's Here on Earth)
Tom Pinder - trombone (joined 2001, also played trombone for Adequate Seven)
Nick Briggs (a.k.a. The Greek) - sax
Matt Price - trumpet (joined late 2000, also original member of Adequate Seven)

Discography
Splottside Rocksteady (2000)
Big Up Clash (split with Lubby Nugget) (2001)
Left for Dead (2003)

External links
myspace.com/shootingoon
Moon Ska Europe profile of Shootin' Goon

Ska punk musical groups
Underground punk scene in the United Kingdom
Welsh punk rock groups
British ska musical groups
Third-wave ska groups